Qizan an-Najjar (also spelled Qizan al-Najar) is a Palestinian village in the southern Gaza Strip, part of the Khan Yunis Governorate. It is located along the Salah al-Din Road between Khan Yunis and Rafah. In the 1997 census by the Palestinian Central Bureau of Statistics (PCBS) Qizan an-Najjar had a population of 2,733. Its population rose to 3,889 in the 2006 estimate by the PCBS.

References

Villages in the Gaza Strip
Municipalities of the State of Palestine